This is an incomplete list of all managers of FC Kremin Kremenchuk.

References

Managers
Kremin Kremenchuk